Clarkdale may refer to:
Clarkdale, Arizona
Clarkdale, California
Clarkdale, Georgia
Clarkdale (microprocessor)

See also
Clarksdale (disambiguation)
Clarkedale, Arkansas